The 25th anniversary of the founding of Hamas took place on Saturday, December 8, 2012. A rally involving hundreds of thousands of Palestinians was held in Gaza Strip and various celebrations were conducted all over the Palestinian Authority.
Thousands of jubilant Hamas supporters openly raised green flags in the West Bank, to celebrate the Islamic organisation's 25th anniversary.

The guest of honor at the ceremony was Hamas leader in-exile Khaled Mashal, who arrived in Gaza Strip for the first time in his life, after entering the Gaza strip through Egypt. In his speech, which Mashal gave at a mass rally attended by hundreds of thousands of supporters, he stated explicitly that the Palestinian people would never compromise with Israel's existence and that the organization will act decisively to gradually conquer and achieve full control over the whole region, which encompass both Israel and the Palestinian territories in order to establish one Islamic state in that region.

Background 

Hamas formed in late 1987, during the first Intifada, as an outgrowth of the Palestinian branch of the Muslim Brotherhood. Co-founder Sheik Ahmed Yassin stated in 1987, and the Hamas Charter affirmed in 1988, that Hamas was founded to liberate the historic region of Palestine from Israeli occupation and to establish an Islamic state in the area that is now Israel, the West Bank, and the Gaza Strip.

Various Hamas elements have used both political and violent means, including terrorism, to pursue the goal of establishing an Islamic Palestinian state in place of the state of Israel.

Since June 2007 Hamas has governed the Gaza portion of the Palestinian Authority, after it won a majority of seats in the Palestinian Parliament in the January 2006 Palestinian parliamentary elections and then defeated the Fatah political organization in a series of violent clashes.

Although Arab nations, Iran, Russia, and Turkey have recognized the Hamas, Israel, the United States, Canada, the European Union, Japan, and many other western countries classify Hamas as a terrorist organization.

Gaza rally 
Palestinian men, women and children flocked to Al-Katiba square despite the rains in the morning and gathered before a huge stage, wearing headbands and waving green flags in support of Hamas which has been controlling Gaza since 2007.

At least 200,000 people attended Saturday's open-air rally, though Hamas said there were 500,000, including 2,500 members of Islamic delegations from Indonesia, Mauritania, Egypt, Algeria, Tunisia, Turkey, Libya and Jordan — the biggest turnout for an event since their founding, according to Bloomberg.

Hamas officials said that at least 3,000 figures from Saudi Arabia, Lebanon, Egypt, Qatar, Bahrain, Kuwait, Turkey and Algeria had arrived in the Gaza Strip especially for the event.

At the main stage in Gaza City, a roaring crowd greeted Khaled Mashaal and Gaza Prime Minister Ismail Haniyeh, who emerged from a door built into a large model of a rocket fired at Israeli cities during the recent fighting.

Ismail Haniyeh's speech 
Hamas Prime Minister Ismail Haniyeh, delivered a speech at the rally in which he stated that Hamas was working toward establishing an Arab and Islamic strategy to liberate “all our occupied Palestinian territories.” He added that the group's “victory” in the eight-day conflict with Israel (In November 2012) marked the beginning of the collapse of Israel.

Hamas has painted itself as the winners of the battle 'Pillar of Cloud', because Israel agreed to a ceasefire brokered by Egypt instead of launching a ground invasion.
Hamas' green dominated the gathering, where some children wore military uniforms and others carried guns.

Khaled Mashal's speech 

Five hours after the start of the event, Khaled Mashal stood on a platform, behind a bank of white flowers. He gave a fiery speech to his supporters, stating among other that:

”Palestine is ours from the river to the sea and from the south to the north. There will be no concession on an inch of the land. We will never recognize the legitimacy of the Israeli occupation and therefore there is no legitimacy for Israel, no matter how long it will take.″

Behind Mashaal was an emblem of an M75 missile and a large portrait of Hamas founder Ahmed Yassin. As he spoke, the crowd chanted slogans calling on Hamas’s armed wing, Izzadin Kassam, to fire rockets next time at Haifa.

Reactions

Palestinian Authority's reaction 
Palestinian Authority President Mahmoud Abbas announced Sunday, 9 December 2012, that he planned to head to Cairo soon to resume reconciliation talks with Hamas but did not condemn the statements by Hamas.

“Reconciliation [with Hamas] is dear to us and the unity of our people,” Abbas told the Arab League in Doha, Qatar.

Hamas leader Khaled Mashaal agreed. He told an audience at Gaza’s Islamic University that “responsibility for Palestine is bigger than one faction alone... Hamas cannot do without Fatah and Fatah cannot do without Hamas.”

The two Palestinian groups have been rivals since Hamas threw Fatah out of Gaza in a bloody coup in 2007. Hamas is also opposed to Fatah’s recognition of Israel along the pre-1967 lines.

Israel's reaction 
Prime Minister Benjamin Netanyahu stated Sunday, 9 December 2012 that “Khaled Mashaal has revealed Hamas’ real face, while Palestinian Authority Chairman Mahmoud Abbas hides behind him by not condemning remarks to destroy Israel.” 

Prime Minister Netanyahu told the Cabinet meeting Sunday morning, “Yesterday we were re-exposed to our enemies' true face. They have no intention of compromising with us; they want to destroy the state. They will fail, of course; in the annals of the history of our people, we – the Jewish People – have overcome such enemies.”

Netanyahu noted that Abbas, who has fostered an image of a “peace partner” while recently declaring unity with Hamas, “has issued no condemnation, not of the remarks about the destruction of Israel, just as previously he did not condemn the missiles that were fired at Israel.”

“To my regret, he strives for unity with the same Hamas that is supported by Iran," the Prime Minister added.

“We in the government have no illusions. We want a true peace with our neighbors. But we will not close our eyes and stick our heads in the sand. We are not prepared to repeat the same mistake of a unilateral withdrawal and withdrawals that, in effect, led Hamas to take control of Gaza.”

“I have always been astonished at the delusions of others who are prepared to continue this process and call it peace. You would hand over more territory, in this case in Judea and Samaria that controls Israel's cities, to the same people and the result, of course, will be a Gaza on the outskirts of Tel Aviv, Hadera and Kfar Saba.”

Netanyahu vowed to withstand international pressure that objected to the new settlement projects for Jews in Jerusalem and the West Bank.

President Shimon Peres shared Netanyahu’s views of Hamas but still maintained that Abbas is a “peace partner”.

The European Union's reaction 
The European Union on Monday, 10 December 2012, denounced as "unacceptable" the statements by Hamas leaders in Gaza "that deny Israel’s right to exist," 
while also condemning Israel for its plans to link Jerusalem with Ma'ale Adumim.

Days earlier, the United Nations passed a resolution, recognizing Palestine as a non-member observer state.

References 

Hamas
Anniversaries
2012 in the Palestinian territories
December 2012 events in Asia